European Insurance and Occupational Pensions Committee (EIOPC) is a regulatory and legislative policy body within the European Union. It was established by the European Commission's Decision 2004/6/EC of 5 November 2003.

See also
 European Insurance and Occupational Pensions Authority

References

Non-institutional bodies of the European Union
Pension regulation
Regulation in the European Union